Louisville Public Schools, officially designated as Cass County District 32, is a school district located at 202 West Third Street in Louisville, Nebraska, United States.

The school colors are purple and gold, and its mascot is the lion.

See also
 List of school districts in Nebraska

References

External links
 Louisville Public Schools
 Louisville Athletics

School districts in Nebraska
Education in Cass County, Nebraska